Kidangoor Subramanya Swami Temple is an ancient Hindu temple located in Kidangoor near Ayarkkunnam in Kottayam district in the Indian state of Kerala. It is one of the renowned Subramanya temples in Kerala which is estimated to be at least 1500 years old.

Location 
The temple is located on Manarcaud - Kidangoor state highway, near the banks of Meenachil river. It is about 2 km from Kidangoor and 5 km from Ayarkunnam.

Deity 
Lord Subramanya presides here by the name 'Thrikkidangoorappan'. He is also known as 'Parighapuresan' because Kidangoor have an alternate name 'Parighapuram'.

Legend 
Kidangoor is one among the 64 Nambudiri villages and was on the boundary of the Vadakkumkur and Thekkumkur kingdoms. The legend has it that the idol of Subramanya came out of the Kamandalu (an oblong pot) of sage Gauna when the water flowed out. The idol flawed along with the water and it reached the Vishnu shrine in Kidangoor.

sub temple deities 
Bhagavathi: (Bhuvaneswari) faces south. Pushpanjaly, Raktha Pushpanjaly, Guruthi, Vara nivedyam, Kadumpayasam and Vella Nivedyam are the main offerings to Devi.
Sastha: Sasthas shrine is placed in the southwest corner. Pushpanjaly, Neivilakku, Neeranjanam, Vella Nivedyam, Ellupayasam, Muzhukkappu and Thirumugam are the important offerings.
Vishnu: Lord Vishnu has equal importance in the temple. He presides here by the name 'Vadakkumthevar' and the shrine is placed to the north of Subramanya sanctum. It is believed to be older than the Subramanya temple.
Ganapathi: Ganapathi, the first-worshipped God in Hinduism, is installed in a separate temple on the south-west side of the temple, facing east. This temple is a sub-temple of Kidangoor Temple, though constructed very recently in 1995.

Festivals 
The temple hosts its annual festival in the Malayalam month of Kumbham (i.e. February/March) which lasts 10 long days. As in many temples in Kerala, the festivities start-off with the ceremonial flag hosting (Kodiyettu) on the Karthika day. The Aarattu (holy bathing) is held at Chembilavu Ponkunnathu Mahadeva temple on the banks of Meenachil river. Lord Shiva who presides at this temple is considered as the father of Thrikkidangoorappan. 'Thaipooyam' in the month of Makaram and 'Skanda Shashti' are the other important festive occasions. Pilgrims from different regions comes here to perform the sacred Shashtivrata on the 6th day of Amavasya.

Offerings 
Utsavabali, Tulabharam, Kavadi, Chuttu Vilakku, Udayasthamana pooja, Muzhukappu, Panchamrita abhishekam, Pantheerazhi, Kadumpayasam are some of the important offerings.

Image Gallery

References 

Murugan temples in Kerala
Hindu temples in Kottayam district

ml:കിടങ്ങൂർ ഗ്രാമപഞ്ചായത്ത്